The Kutai Kartanegara Bridge (also known as the Mahakam II Bridge) is an Indonesian arch bridge, formerly a suspension bridge that is located on the island of Borneo in Kalimantan Timur, crossing the Mahakam River and connecting Tenggarong and Samarinda.

The 710-metre-long bridge, which featured a 270-metre-long suspended section, was intended to resemble San Francisco's Golden Gate Bridge. Construction on the bridge commenced in 1995 and was completed in 2001. It was the longest suspension bridge in Indonesia.

On 26 November 2011, the bridge collapsed only ten years after it was completed, killing at least 20 people and injuring 39.

The bridge was constructed by state-owned builders PT Hutama Karya at a cost of Rp 150 billion (US$16.4 million).

Collapse

On 26 November 2011 at  9:59pm (local time), while workers were performing maintenance on the bridge, a support cable snapped and the structure suffered a catastrophic failure. The roadway fell into the 50-metre-deep Mahakam River below, leaving only the two bridge towers and some support cables remaining. At least 20 people were killed and 40 were injured, with an additional 19 people reported missing.

A replacement arch bridge was built in 2013 and formally opened in December 2015.

References

2011 industrial disasters
Bridges completed in 2001
Bridge disasters in Indonesia
Bridges in Indonesia
Suspension bridges
Buildings and structures in East Kalimantan